Scott Burns is an American computer engineer and a former music producer of death metal records from late 1980s and 1990s. He was crucial to the emergence of the Florida death metal scene.

He has produced many records for many famous death metal bands, including Death, Deicide, Cannibal Corpse, Sepultura, Obituary, Atheist, Transmetal, Suffocation, and Cynic. He has engineered some of the top genre-defining death metal albums such as Death's Human, Massacre's From Beyond, Obituary's Slowly We Rot, and Assück's Misery Index. He most recently worked on the album Frozen in Time (2005) by Obituary. Burns has since quit producing full-time to work in computer programming.

Albums produced/mixed/engineered

 

 Internal Bleeding - Voracious Contempt (Mixing) (1996)
 KMFDM - Glory (remixed "Move On") (1993)
 Jason Rawhead - Dehumanized (1995)
 Loudblast - Disincarnate (1991)
 Loudblast - Sublime Dementia (1993)
 Malevolent Creation - The Ten Commandments (1990)
 Malevolent Creation - Retribution (1992)
 Malevolent Creation - In Cold Blood (1997)
 Master - Master (1990)
 Master - On the Seventh Day God Created ... Master (1991)
 Massacre - From Beyond (1991)
 Monstrosity - Millennium (1996)
 Napalm Death - Harmony Corruption (1990)
 Napalm Death - Suffer The Children (1991)
 Nasty Savage - Miscellaneous Releases  (1985–1989)
 No Return - Contamination Rises (1992)
 Obituary - Slowly We Rot (1989)
 Obituary - Cause of Death (1990)
 Obituary - The End Complete (1992)
 Obituary - World Demise (1994)
 Obituary - Frozen in Time (2005)
 Overthrow - Within Suffering (1990)
 Pestilence - Testimony of the Ancients (1991)
 Psychotic Waltz - Mosquito (1994)
 Psychotic Waltz - Bleeding (1996)
 Raped Ape - Terminal Reality (6-song mini album) (1992)
 Resurrection - Embalmed Existence (1993)
 Sadus - Elements of Anger (1997)
 Solstice - Solstice (1992)
 Sean Malone - Cortlandt (1996)
 Sepultura - Beneath the Remains (1989)
 Sepultura - Arise (1991)
 Sepultura - Third World Posse (1992)
 Six Feet Under - Haunted (1995)
 Slap of Reality - Fletch (1991)
 Skeletal Earth - Eulogy for a Dying Fetus (1991)
 Speckmann Project - Speckmann Project (1992)
 Suffocation - Effigy of the Forgotten (1991)
 Suffocation - Pierced from Within (1995)
 Suffocation - Despise the Sun (1998)
 Terrorizer - World Downfall (listed as engineer) (1989)
 Transmetal - El Infierno de Dante (1993)
 Transmetal - Mexico Barbaro (1996)
 Various artists - At Death's Door (1990)
 Various artists - At Death's Door II (1993)

References

Living people
Heavy metal producers
American record producers
American electronics engineers
Year of birth missing (living people)